Montenegro is scheduled to compete at the 2019 European Games in Minsk from 21 to 30 June 2019. Montenegro is represented by 11 athletes in 5 sports.

Competitors

Medalists

Archery

Recurve

Boxing

Men

Judo

Men

Karate

Men

Shooting

Men

Women

References 

Nations at the 2019 European Games
European Games
2019